Bantia michaelisi is a species of praying mantis in the family Thespidae.

See also
List of mantis genera and species

References

michaelisi
Insects described in 1935